The 2022 Pacific hurricane season was a fairly active tropical cyclone season, with 19 named storm altogether. Ten of those became hurricanes, and four further intensified into major hurricanes (category 3 or higher on the 5-level Saffir–Simpson wind speed scale). Two of this season's storms, Bonnie and Julia, survived the overland crossover from the Atlantic. The season officially started on May 15 in the eastern Pacific—east of 140°W—and June 1 in the central Pacific—between the International Date Line and 140°W, and ended in both regions on November 30. These dates conventionally delimit the period of each year when most tropical cyclones form in the eastern Pacific basin. The season's first storm, Agatha, formed on May 28, and last, Roslyn, dissipated on October 23. Rosyln made landfall in Nayarit with  winds, making it the strongest landfalling Pacific hurricane since Patricia in 2015.

This timeline documents tropical cyclone formations, strengthening, weakening, landfalls, extratropical transitions, and dissipations during the season. It includes information that was not released throughout the season, meaning that data from post-storm reviews by the National Hurricane Center, such as a storm that was not initially warned upon, has been included.

By convention, meteorologists use one time zone when issuing forecasts and making observations: Coordinated Universal Time (UTC), and also use the 24-hour clock (where 00:00 = midnight UTC). Tropical cyclone advisories in the Eastern North Pacific basin use both UTC and the nautical time zone where the center of the tropical cyclone is currently located. Time zones utilized (east to west) are: Central, Mountain, Pacific and Hawaii. In this timeline, all information is listed by UTC first, with the respective regional time zone included in parentheses. Additionally, figures for maximum sustained winds and position estimates are rounded to the nearest 5 units (knots, miles, or kilometers), following National Hurricane Center practice. Direct wind observations are rounded to the nearest whole number. Atmospheric pressures are listed to the nearest millibar and nearest hundredth of an inch of mercury.

Timeline of events

May
May 15
 The Eastern Pacific hurricane season officially begins.

May 28
 00:00 UTC (7:00 p.m.
06:00 UTC (1:00 a.m. CDT) at Tropical Depression One-E strengthens into Tropical Storm Agatha south-southwest of Bahia de Hautulco.

May 29
06:00 UTC (1:00 a.m. CDT) at Tropical Storm Agatha strengthens into a Category 1 hurricane west-southwest of Bahia de Huatulco.
18:00 UTC (1:00 p.m.

May 30

21:00 UTC (4:00 p.m.

May 31
00:00 UTC (7:00 p.m.
06:00 UTC (1:00 a.m. CDT) at Hurricane Agatha weakens to a tropical storm inland.
12:00 UTC (7:00 a.m. CDT) at Tropical Storm Agatha weakens to a tropical depression inland north-northwest of Salina Cruz, Oaxaca.
18:00 UTC (1:00 p.m. CDT) at Tropical Depression Agatha degenerates into a remnant low inland over the northern Isthmus of Tehuantepec, and is later absorbed into a disorganized area of disturbed weather.

June
June 1
 The Central Pacific hurricane season officially begins.

June 14
06:00 UTC (1:00 a.m.

June 15
12:00 UTC (7:00 a.m.

June 16

00:00 UTC (7:00 p.m.
18:00 UTC (1:00 p.m.

June 17
00:00 UTC (7:00 p.m.

June 18
00:00 UTC (7:00 p.m.
06:00 UTC (11:00 p.m. MDT, June 17) at Hurricane Blas weakens to a tropical storm south of the southern tip of the Baja California peninsula.
18:00 UTC (12:00 p.m.

 June 21
12:00 UTC (7:00 a.m.

June 24
18:00 UTC (12:00 p.m.

 June 28
06:00 UTC (11:00 p.m. PDT, June 27) at Tropical Storm Celia weakens to a tropical depression west of the southern tip of the Baja California peninsula.
18:00 UTC (11:00 a.m.

July 
July 2
15:00 UTC (10:00 a.m.

July 4

03:00 UTC (10:00 p.m.
21:00 UTC (4:00 p.m.

July 5
15:00 UTC (10:00 a.m.

July 6
03:00 UTC (9:00 p.m.

July 7
09:00 UTC (3:00 a.m.

July 8
21:00 UTC (2:00 p.m.

July 9
12:00 UTC (6:00 a.m.
18:00 UTC (12:00 p.m. MDT) at The tropical depression strengthens into Tropical Storm Darby.
21:00 UTC (2:00 p.m.

July 11
00:00 UTC (2:00 p.m. HST, July 10) at Tropical Storm Darby strengthens into a Category 1 hurricane.
06:00 UTC (8:00 p.m. HST, July 10) at Hurricane Darby intensifies to Category 2 strength.
12:00 UTC (2:00 a.m. HST) at Hurricane Darby intensifies to Category 3 strength.
18:00 UTC (8:00 a.m.

July 12
18:00 UTC (8:00 a.m. HST) at Hurricane Darby weakens to Category 3 strength.

July 13

00:00 UTC (2:00 p.m. HST, July 12) at Hurricane Darby weakens to Category 2 strength.
18:00 UTC (8:00 a.m. HST) at Hurricane Darby re-intensifies to Category 3 strength.

July 14
06:00 UTC (8:00 p.m. HST, July 13) at Hurricane Darby weakens to Category 2 strength.

July 15
00:00 UTC (2:00 p.m. HST, July 14) at Hurricane Darby weakens to Category 1 strength.
12:00 UTC (2:00 a.m.
12:00 UTC (7:00 a.m.

July 16
00:00 UTC (7:00 p.m. CDT, July 15) at Tropical Depression Six-E strengthens into Tropical Storm Estelle south-southwest of Acapulco.

July 17
00:00 UTC (2:00 p.m. HST, July 16) at Tropical Storm Darby opens up into a trough south of the Big Island of Hawaii.
00:00 UTC (7:00 p.m. CDT, July 16) at Tropical Storm Estelle strengthens into a Category 1 hurricane south of Manzanillo, Colima.
12:00 UTC (6:00 a.m.

July 19
06:00 UTC (12:00 a.m.

July 21
6:00 UTC (11:00 p.m.

July 26
 00:00 UTC (7:00 p.m.
 6:00 UTC (1:00 a.m. CDT) at Tropical Depression Seven-E strengthens into Tropical Storm Frank south of Acapulco.

July 27
12:00 UTC (6:00 a.m.
18:00 UTC (11:00 a.m. PDT) at Tropical Depression Eight-E strengthens into Tropical Storm Georgette south-southwest of the southern tip of the Baja California peninsula.

July 29
06:00 UTC (11:00 p.m.

July 30
00:00 UTC (6:00 p.m.
06:00 UTC (11:00 p.m.

July 31
18:00 UTC (11:00 a.m.

August
August 1
06:00 UTC (11:00 p.m. PDT, July 31) at Hurricane Frank weakens to a tropical storm west of the southern tip of the Baja California peninsula.

August 2
18:00 UTC (11:00 a.m.

August 3
18:00 UTC (11:00 a.m.

August 6
12:00 UTC (7:00 a.m.

August 7
18:00 UTC (12:00 p.m. MDT) at Tropical Depression Nine-E strengthens into Tropical Storm Howard west-southwest of Manzanillo, Colima.

August 8

18:00 UTC (12:00 p.m. MDT) at Tropical Storm Howard strengthens into a Category 1 hurricane.

August 9
00:00 UTC (6:00 p.m.

August 10
00:00 UTC (5:00 p.m. PDT, August 9) at Hurricane Howard weakens into a tropical storm.

August 11
00:00 UTC (5:00 p.m.

August 13
12:00 UTC (6:00 a.m.

August 15
12:00 UTC (6:00 a.m.

August 16
00:00 UTC (6:00 p.m. MDT, August 15) at Tropical Storm Ivette weakens to a tropical depression southwest of the southern tip of the Baja California peninsula.
18:00 UTC (11:00 a.m.

September
September 1
18:00 UTC 12:00 p.m.

September 2
06:00 UTC (12:00 a.m. MDT) at Tropical Depression Eleven-E intensifies into Tropical Storm Javier while passing to the west of Socorro Island.

September 3
00:00 UTC (6:00 p.m.
18:00 UTC (11:00 a.m. PDT) at Tropical Storm Javier degenerates into a post-tropical low off the western coast of Baja California Sur, and subsequently dissipates.

September 4
15:00 UTC (10:00 a.m.
21:00 UTC (4:00 p.m.

September 5
21:00 UTC (3:00 p.m.

September 7
09:00 UTC (3:00 a.m.
15:00 UTC (9:00 a.m.

September 8
03:00 UTC (9:00 p.m.
21:00 UTC (3:00 p.m.

September 9
00:00 UTC (6:00 p.m.
 
September 10
03:00 UTC (8:00 p.m. PDT, September 9) at  – Tropical Storm Kay transitions into a post-tropical cyclone about 145 mi (230 km) southwest of San Diego, California.

September 15
18:00 UTC (1:00 p.m.

September 16
06:00 UTC (1:00 a.m.
18:00 UTC (1:00 p.m.

September 17
06:00 UTC (1:00 a.m.
12:00 UTC (7:00 a.m.

September 19
12:00 UTC (6:00 a.m.

September 20
12:00 UTC (6:00 a.m.

September 21
12:00 UTC (7:00 a.m.
18:00 UTC (2:00 p.m. CDT) at Tropical Depression Fifteen-E intensifies into Tropical Storm Newton south-southwest of Manzanillo.

September 22
12:00 UTC (8:00 a.m.

September 24
18:00 UTC (12:00 p.m. MDT) at Tropical Storm Newton weakens to a tropical depression.

September 25
18:00 UTC (11:00 a.m.

September 28
18:00 UTC (1:00 p.m.

September 29
00:00 UTC (7:00 p.m. CDT, September 28)) at Tropical Depression Sixteen-E intensifies into Tropical Storm Orlene.

October
October 1
12:00 UTC (6:00 a.m.

October 2

00:00 UTC (6:00 p.m. MDT, October 1) at Hurricane Orlene intensifies into a Category 2 hurricane.
06:00 UTC (12:00 a.m.
12:00 UTC (6:00 a.m.
18:00 UTC (12:00 p.m. MDT) at Hurricane Orlene weakens to a Category 3 hurricane near Islas Marias.

October 3
00:00 UTC (6:00 p.m. MDT, October 2) at Hurricane Orlene weakens to a Category 2 hurricane.
06:00 UTC (12:00 a.m.
12:00 UTC (6:00 a.m. MDT) at Hurricane Orlene weakens to a Category 1 hurricane south-southeast of Mazatlan, Sinaloa.
14:35 UTC (9:35 a.m.
18:00 UTC (1:00 p.m. CDT) at Hurricane Orlene weakens to a tropical storm inland east of Mazatlan, and rapidly dissipates.
18:00 UTC (12:00 p.m. MDT) at The tropical depression strengthens to Tropical Storm Paine.

October 4
18:00 UTC (12:00 p.m.

October 5
06:00 UTC (12:00 a.m.

October 10
00:00 UTC (7:00 p.m.
11:00 UTC (6:00 a.m.
12:00 UTC (7:00 a.m.

October 20
00:00 UTC (7:00 p.m.
12:00 UTC (7:00 a.m. CDT) at Tropical Depression Nineteen-E strengthens into Tropical Storm Roslyn.

October 22
00:00 UTC (7:00 p.m.
06:00 UTC (1:00 a.m.
18:00 UTC (12:00 a.m.

October 23

06:00 UTC (12:00 a.m.
11:20 UTC (5:20 a.m.
18:00 UTC (1:00 p.m.

October 24
00:00 UTC (7:00 p.m. CDT, October 23) at Tropical Storm Roslyn degenerates into a remnant low over Coahuila, west of Monterrey, Nuevo León, and later dissipates.

November
 No tropical cyclones formed in the basin during the month of November.

November 30
 The 2022 Pacific hurricane season ends in the Eastern Pacific and Central Pacific basins.

See also

 Timeline of the 2022 Atlantic hurricane season
 Tropical cyclones in 2022
 List of Pacific hurricanes

Notes

References

External links

 2022 Tropical Cyclone Advisory Archive, National Hurricane Center and Central Pacific Hurricane Center, noaa.gov

2022 Pacific hurricane season
Pacific hurricane meteorological timelines
Articles which contain graphical timelines